Kashan (Qashan; Cassan; also romanized as Kāshān) is a city in the northern part of Isfahan province, Iran.  At the 2016 census, its population was 304,487 in 90,828 families.

Some etymologists argue that the city name comes from the Kasian, the original inhabitants of the city, whose remains are found at Tapeh Sialk dating back 9,000 years; later this was changed to "Kashian", hence the town name. Between the 12th and the 14th centuries Kashan was an important centre for the production of high quality pottery and tiles. In modern Persian, the word for a tile (kashi) comes from the name of the town.

Kashan is divided into two parts, mountainous and desert. In the west side, Kashan is cited in the neighbourhood of two of highest peaks of Karkas chain, Mount Gargash to the southwest of Kashan (the home of Iran national observatory, the largest astronomical telescope of Iran) and Mount Ardehaal in the west of Kashan, also known as "Damavand of Kashan" and the highest peak of Ardehaal mountains (end part of Karkas chain in central Iran).

In the east side of the city Kashan opens up to the central desert of Iran. Kashan is also known for Maranjab Desert and Caravanserai located near the namak lake (or salt lake). Today Maranjab and the surrounding Shifting Sands is a visitor destination at the weekends for safaris.
 
On August 9, 2007, Iran placed the Historical Axis of Fin, Sialk, Kashan on its Tentative List for possible future nomination as a UNESCO World Heritage Site. The exact definition of what locations within Kashan proper might be nominated was not made clear. In 2012 Iran successfully nominated the Fin Garden separately for inscription by UNESCO as a part of its Persian Gardens World Heritage Site. Despite this the "Historical-Cultural Axis of Fin, Sialk, Kashan" remains in full on Iran's Tentative List.

The Boroujerdiha house is one of the famous historical places from the Qajar period. This house is well known with unique architecture, which has a specific beauty. The house has two internal and external patios. Other parts consist of kitchen, porch, aisle, the summer and winter courtyards are very beautiful.

History

Earliest evidence of human presence around Kashan date back to Paleolithic period that have been found at Niasar, Kaftar Khoun and Sefid-Ab. Middle Paleolithic stone tools were discovered at travertine spring of Niasar and the travertine of Kaftar Khoun. Upper Paleolithic groups were living around Sefid-Ab spring at SW of Kashan.
Archeological discoveries in the Sialk Hillocks which lie 4 km west of Kashan reveal that this region was one of the primary centers of civilization in pre-historic ages. Hence, Kashan dates back to the Elamite period of Iran. The Sialk ziggurat still stands today in the suburbs of Kashan after 7,000 years.

The artifacts uncovered at Sialk Mahan Pasha reside in the Louvre in Paris and the New York Metropolitan Museum of Art, and Iran's National Museum.

By some accounts, although not all, Kashan was the origin of the three wise men who followed the star that guided them to Bethlehem to witness the nativity of Jesus, as recounted in the Bible. For example, medieval traveler Friar Odoric of Pordenone related this story in 1330 after having visited there. Whatever the historical validity, the attribution of Kashan as their original home testifies to the city's prestige at the time the story was set down.

According to a legend dating from the Safavid era, Abu Lu'lu'a, the Persian skilled craftsman who was enslaved by the Islamic conquerors and who eventually assassinated the caliph Umar ibn al-Khattab in 644, fled to Kashan after the assassination. The shrine that was built over his supposed tomb is one of Kashan's conspicuous landmarks (see gallery below).

Sultan Malik Shah I of the Seljuk dynasty ordered the building of a fortress in the middle of Kashan in the 11th century. The fortress walls, called Ghal'eh Jalali still stand today in central Kashan.

Kashan was also a leisure vacation spot for Safavid kings. Bagh-e Fin (Fin Garden), specifically, is one of the most famous gardens of Iran. This garden with its pool and orchards was designed for Shah Abbas I as a classical Persian vision of paradise. The original Safavid buildings have been substantially replaced and rebuilt by the Qajar dynasty although the layout of trees and marble basins is close to the original. The garden itself however, was first founded 7000 years ago alongside the Cheshmeh-ye-Soleiman. The garden is also notorious as the site of the murder of Mirza Taghi Khan known as Amir Kabir, chancellor of Nasser-al-Din Shah, Iran's king in 1852.

The earthquake of 1778 leveled the city of Kashan and all the edifices of Shah Abbas Safavi, leaving 8000 casualties. But the city started afresh and has today become a focal tourist attraction via the numerous large houses from the 18th and 19th centuries, illustrating the finest examples of Qajari aesthetics.

Geographical location 
The city of Kashan is located in the north of Isfahan province and in the north of the  Karkas mountain and in the east of the central desert of Iran, where it is poor in terms of vegetation and where bushes and shrubs are more or less found. Dare mountain is next to Dare village and 14 kilometers southwest of Kashan with a height of 2,985 meters overlooking the city of Kashan, and Gargash peak is the highest peak of the Karkas mountain range, 33 kilometers southwest of Kashan and 12 kilometers southwest of Qamsar and 7 kilometers northeast of Kamu with a height of 3,600 meters is located near the city of Kamu and Chogan. Kashan has the least light and air pollution. For this reason, it was chosen by international experts as the most appropriate and best place to establish the National Observatory of Iran, and the home of one of the largest large telescopes in the Middle East with the latest technology. Ardahal peak is located 35 kilometers west of Kashan with a height of 3505 meters after Gargash, the highest point of Kashan heights (continuation of the central mountain range) in the vicinity of Niaser and the villages of Mazosh, Nashlej and Mashhad.

Climate

Kashan has a hot desert climate (BWh) in Köppen climate classification and (BW) in Trewartha climate classification, with cold winters (although warmer than other Iranian cities) and hot, sometimes very hot summers. Kashan is significantly warmer than other cities in the Iranian Plateau due to its lower elevation. Its climate is somewhat similar to Qom and Yazd.

Main sights

Kashan's architectural sights include:
 40 Dokhtaran Fortress
 Abbāsi House
 Attarha House
 Al-e Yaseen House
 Agha Bozorg Mosque
 Āmeri House
 Bazaar of Kashan
 Boroujerdi House
 Fin Garden
 Fin Bathroom
 Ghal'eh jalali
 Jalali Castle
 Jameh Mosque of Kashan
 Manouchehris House
 Menar tower
 Meydan Mosque
 Shrine of Abu Lu'lu'a (shrine dedicated to the assassin of Umar, the second Islamic caliph)
 Sultan Amir Ahmad Bathhouse
 Tabātabāei House
 Tabriziha Mosque
 Tepe Sialk
 Timcheh Amin-o-dowleh

Today

Although there are many sites in Kashan of potential interest to tourists, the city remains largely undeveloped in this sector, with fewer than a thousand foreign tourists per year. Notable towns around Kashan are Qamsar and Abyaneh, which attract tourists all year around. The nearby town of Niasar features a man-made cave and fireplace of historical interest.

Kashan is known for the manufacture of carpets, silk and other textiles. Today, Kashan houses most of Iran's mechanized carpet-weaving factories, and has an active marble and copper mining industry. Kashan and suburbs have a population of 400,000.

Education

There are more than 10,000 students currently studying in various fields (e.g.:Applied sciences, Engineering, Art, Law, Medical sciences, Nano technology, literature, Carpet and Handicrafts, etc.) at universities of Kashan.
Colleges and universities in Kashan include:
Kashan University of Medical Sciences
Islamic Azad University of Kashan
University of Kashan

Accessibility

Road 71
Freeway 7, located near the city

Kashan is connected via freeways to Isfahan and Natanz to the South, and Qom, which is an hour drive away to the north.

Kashan railway station is along the main north–south railways of Iran.

Kashan Airport reopened on 2 June 2016 after twenty years hiatus with an ATA Airlines flight from Mashhad International Airport. The airport aims to launch flights to Kish Island and Qehshm Island in Iran and Najaf in Iraq.

Notable people

David Alliance, Baron Alliance
Ghyath ad-Din Jamshid Kashani
Kamal-ol-Molk
Amir Ghafour
Ehsan Hajsafi
Javad Kazemian
Mohsen Feyz Kashani
Sohrab Sepehri
Ustad Ali Maryam
Afdal al-Din Kashani
Reza Abbasi
Sani ol molk
Kalim Kashani
Muhtasham Kashani
Ghotb Ravandi
Saeed Hajjarian
Mohammad Motamedi
Mulla Muhammad Mahdi Naraqi
Molla Fathollah Kashani
Sani ol molk

Molok zarabi
Parivash zangane

Twin towns – sister cities
 Neishabour, Iran

Gallery

See also

Aran va Bidgol
Iranian Architecture
Kashan rug
List of the historical structures in the Isfahan province
Maranjab Desert
Namak lake
Sialk - Kashan's ancient architecture.
Traditional Persian residential architecture

References

External links

 Kashan Municipality
 University of Kashan
 Kashan University of medical sciences
 Islamic Azad university of Kashan
 Kashan Culture Foundation
Art from Kashan at the Metropolitan Museum of Art

 
Architecture in Iran
Oases of Iran
Cities in Isfahan Province
Populated places in Kashan County